Tāizhōu (pronunciation in PRC Standard Mandarin: , Taizhou dialect: Thecieu), alternately known as Taichow, is a city located at the middle of the East China Sea coast of Zhejiang province. It is bordered by Ningbo to the north, Wenzhou to the south, and Shaoxing, Jinhua, and Lishui to west. In addition to the municipality itself, the prefecture-level city of Taizhou includes 3 districts, 3 county-level cities, and 3 counties.
As of the 2020 census, its total population was 6,662,888 inhabitants whom 3,578,660 lived in the built-up (or metro) area made of the three urban Districts and Wenling City now being largely conurbated.

Etymology
Taizhou's name is believed to derive from nearby Mount Tiantai.

History

Five thousand years ago, the ancestors of the modern inhabitants began to settle in this area. During the Xia, Shang, and Zhou dynasties, when the Chinese state was largely confined to the Yellow River basin, the area of present-day Taizhou was part of Dong'ou. Following the 3rd-century BC conquests of the Qin Empire, a settlement in the area was known as Huipu Town. It was initially included in the Minzhong Prefecture, but then moved to Kuaiji during the Han.

On August 22, 1994, Taizhou Municipality was set up in place of Taizhou Prefecture and approved by the State Council. In 1999, Taizhou was approved by the State Council to be a leading city in Zhejiang's urbanization structure and the center of sub zone of the first-class economy. Approved by the National Development and Reform Commission, Taizhou formally became one of the 16 cities of Yangtze River Delta area on Aug.15, 2003.

Demographics
At the time of 2010 census, the whole population of Taizhou, including the whole prefecture-level city and subsidiary counties was 5,968,838 with 3,269,304 in the emerging built-up area made of 3 urban districts, Jiaojiang, Huangyan, Luqiao and Wenling City largely being urbanized.

Administration

The prefecture-level city of Taizhou currently administers 3 districts, 3 county-level cities and 3 counties.

Geography

At , Taizhou has a long coastline dotted with numerous islands; the largest one is Yuhuan Island in the south. Coastal areas in the east tend to flat, with an occasional hill. Eastern and northern parts of Taizhou are mountainous, with Yandangshan Mountains in the southwest, Kuocang Mountains in the west, and Mount Tiantai in the northwest. The highest point of Taizhou is Mishailang, a  peak in the Kuocang Mountains, and also the highest point in the east of the Zhejiang Province.

Climate

Taizhou has a humid subtropical climate (Köppen Cfa) with four distinctive seasons. Occasionally struck by typhoons in the summers, the climate characterised by hot, humid summers and drier and cold winters with occasional snow.

Economy and industry

Taizhou is one of the birthplace of China's private economy in the early days of economic reforms in China. It is the cradle of the Chinese private economy, the name of Taizhou Model is after it. It is the 4th most populous, and the 4th largest industrial prefecture-level city in Zhejiang Province .

Chinese automotive manufacturing company Geely was founded in Taizhou which completes its acquisition of Volvo Cars in 2010, is one of China's top ten auto manufacturers.

Chinese auto parts manufacturer based Yuanhuan was one of China auto parts manufacturer based, here can produce all auto parts for vehicles.

The largest HVAC fan company Yilida is also located in Taizhou. It is listed on Shenzhen Stock Exchange (Stock #002686) and has acquired Fulihua fan company in Suzhou in 2012.

Taizhou is also one of the most important Mandarin, Loquat, Wendan (a kind of Pomelo), Myrica rubra producers in China. Other agricultural product including Rice, Canola, edible Wild rice stems or Zizania latifolia, Eddoe, Water chestnut, Bamboo

Infrastructure and transport

Historically, Taizhou was relatively inaccessible by road. This has changed due to large infrastructure restructuring in the late 1990s and early 2000s. Taizhou Luqiao Airport was once named Huangyan Luqiao Airport (IATA:HYN) in the city's Luqiao District serves daily flights to Beijing and Chengdu and regular flights to other major Chinese cities.

In September 2009, the high-speed Ningbo–Taizhou–Wenzhou railway opened. There are several stations in the prefecture boundaries of Taizhou. The station serving the urban core is in Huangyan District and is called Taizhou railway station. A second line, the Hangzhou–Taizhou high-speed railway, will open in 2021. Taizhou Central railway station on the line will serve Jiaojiang District.

The first line of Taizhou Rail Transit opened in December 2022.

Language and culture
Like the majority of areas in Zhejiang, most people from Taizhou speak a dialect of Wu Chinese, known as Taizhou Wu. It is not mutually intelligible with Mandarin Chinese, and only partially intelligible with Shanghainese. There is also a small portion of Min Nan and Wenzhou dialect speakers in the southern regions. None of these three languages are mutually intelligible amongst each other, but the linguistic diversity of some regions has resulted in a segment of the population becoming fluent in speaking up to four languages, when Mandarin is included.

The city's people are reputed to be industrious and business-minded, although not to the same degree as neighboring Wenzhou. Many people from the area have migrated abroad after economic reforms began in China in 1978. The city's seafood is of note.

Education

 Taizhou University

Notable people
 Ji Gong
 Chen Fangyun - electrical engineer and recipient of the "Two Bombs, One Satellite" Meritorious Award
 Li Shufu
 Fan Yilin- 2015 & 2017 Uneven Bars World Gymnastics Champion
 Zhou Jieqiong,  - Produce 101 Contestant, member of I.O.I
 Xu Jiaqi - SNH48 Member of Team SII, member of sub-unit 7SENSES, member of THE9

Tourism
Linhai Ancient Great Wall, the only Great Wall in southern China.
Guoqing Temple, Mountain Tiantai

The Guoqing Temple where the Tiantai, an important school of Buddhism in China, Japan, Korea, and Vietnam originates, is located here. In Japan the school is known as Tendai, and in Korea it is known as Cheontae.

Sister cities
 Fort Wayne, Indiana, United States (2012)
 Hanau, Germany

See also
List of twin towns and sister cities in China
Ruyi Bridge

References

External links

Government website of Taizhou
Geely Group

 
Cities in Zhejiang
Prefecture-level divisions of Zhejiang